Visarga means "sending forth, discharge". In Sanskrit phonology,  (also called,  equivalently,  by earlier grammarians) is the name of a phone voiceless glottal fricative, written as 'ః'

Since  is a common inflectional suffix (of nominative singular, second person singular, etc.), visarga appears frequently in Sanskrit texts. In the traditional order of Sanskrit sounds, visarga and anusvāra appear between vowels and stop consonants.

The precise pronunciation of visarga in Vedic texts may vary between Śākhās. Some pronounce a slight echo of the preceding vowel after the aspiration:  will be pronounced , and  will be pronounced . Visarga is not to be confused with colon.

Types 
The visarga is commonly found in writing, resembling the punctuation mark of colon or as two tiny circles one above the other. This form is retained by most Indian scripts.

They were written with various symbols, e.g. X-like symbol vs sideways 3-like symbol above flipped sideways one, or both as two crescent-shaped semi-circles one above the other, facing the top and bottom respectively. Distinct signs for jihavamulīya and upadhmanīya exists in Kannada, Tibetan, Sharada, Brahmi and Lantsa scripts.

Other Brahmic scripts

Burmese 
In the Burmese script, the visarga (variously called  shay ga pauk,  wizza nalone pauk, or  shay zi and represented with two dots to the right of the letter as ), when used with joined to a letter, creates the high tone.

Japanese 

Motoori Norinaga invented a mark for visarga which he used in a book about Indian orthography.

Javanese 
In the Javanese script, the visarga (known as the wignyan) is represented by a two curls to the right of a syllable as : the first curl is short and circular, and the second curl is long. It adds a /-h/ after a vowel.

Kannada 
In the Kannada script, the visarga (which is called visarga) is represented with two small circles to the right of a letter ಃ. It brings an "aḥ" sound to the end of the letter.

Khmer 
In the Khmer script, the visarga (known as the reăhmŭkh ("shining face")) indicates an aspirated  sound added after a syllable.

Lao 
As in the neighboring related Thai script, it indicates a glottal stop after the vowel.

Odia 
It indicates the post-vocalic voiceless glottal fricative aḥ [h] sound after the letter.

Tamil 
Like Sanskrit, it cannot add on to any letter and add aspiration to them. It should be always placed between a single short vowel() and a hard consonant for example  (aqthu),  (eqgu).

Telugu 
In the Telugu script, the visarga (which is called visarga) is represented with two small circles to the right of a letter . It brings an "ah" sound to the end of the letter.

Thai 
It represents a glottal stop that follows the affected vowel.

References 

Vyakarana
Brahmic diacritics